The 2019–20 season is Estudiantes' 26th consecutive season in the top division of Argentine football. In addition to the Primera División, the club are competing in the Copa Argentina and Copa de la Superliga.

The season generally covers the period from 1 July 2019 to 30 June 2020.

Review

Pre-season
Three players agreed departures from Estudiantes in June 2019, with Ezequiel Miranda heading to Deportivo Paraguayo while Nicolás Talpone and Fernando Evangelista joined Atlanta and Aldosivi respectively. Daniel Sappa and Gastón Gil Romero were both loaned out, to Arsenal de Sarandí and Aldosivi, on 24 June - the former having an optional six-month recall clause. Carlo Lattanzio completed a loan move to Estudiantes' Caseros namesakes on 27 June. On that same day, the club announced a transfer agreement had been reached with Godoy Cruz for midfielder Ángel González; subject to contract terms and a medical. After terminating his deal, Emiliano Ozuna left for Mexico's Celaya on 27 June. They beat and drew with their reserves in 29 June friendlies.

Numerous players who had loan stints out last season, including Gastón Campi and Juan Cascini, returned on and around 30 June. Federico González was signed from recently relegated Tigre on 2 July, having had a relegation clause in his contract. A scheduled friendly with Estrella de Berisso for 10 July was cancelled on 2 July, with Cambaceres visiting City Bell instead. Ignacio Bailone joined Chacarita Juniors on 3 July, while Matías Ruíz Díaz was loaned out to Guillermo Brown on 4 July. Ángel González's transaction from Godoy Cruz was confirmed on 6 July, the same date that they beat Uruguay's Fénix in pre-season friendlies. Days later they went six exhibition matches undefeated after a 2–0 win and a 0–0 draw with Cambaceres of Primera D Metropolitana.

Estudiantes, on 12 July, revealed an agreement with Boston River for the transfer of Diego García; subject to a medical and personal terms. They drew in a friendly with San Lorenzo on 13 July, which was followed by a 3–2 loss later in the day. García's incoming was made official on 15 July. Nahuel Luna went on loan to Villa San Carlos on the same day. Estudiantes gave Gastón Campi permission, on 15 July, to travel to Turkey to finalize a move to Trabzonspor. Young defender Juan Ignacio Saborido left for Villa San Carlos on 16 July. Campi formally departed for Trabzonspor on 19 July.

July
Estudiantes played their first official fixture of 2019–20 on 20 July, subsequently eliminating Primera B Nacional's Mitre from the Copa Argentina after netting two unanswered goals at the Estadio Coloso del Ruca Quimey in Cutral Có. Matías Pellegrini, who had scored in the aforementioned cup tie, agreed terms for a departure on 23 July as the left midfielder penned a deal with new Major League Soccer franchise Inter Miami. However, he was loaned back to Estudiantes until the year's end. An incoming was confirmed on 24 July in Chilean Juan Fuentes from O'Higgins. A goal from Jonathan Schunke won Estudiantes the points in their league opener against Aldosivi on 28 July. On 30 July, Estudiantes revealed Nicolás Bazzana would go to Aldosivi on loan; subject to a medical.

Nicolás Bazzana's move to Aldosivi was officially completed on 31 July.

August
Mauricio Vera joined Guillermo Brown on 2 August. Estudiantes suffered a defeat on matchday two in the Primera División, as Banfield narrowly beat them at the Estadio Florencio Sola on 4 August. Two days later, goals from Mateo Retegui and Francisco Apaolaza helped them beat their academy in an exhibition match; intended for the players who didn't feature against Banfield. Estudiantes met Cambaceres in a friendly for the third time in 2019–20 on 10 August, with Ángel González netting in a 2–0 win; as he did on 10 July. Instituto loaned Francisco Apaolaza from Estudiantes on 15 August. Bautista Cejas signed for Quilmes on 17 August. Estudiantes took their points tally to six on 19 August, as they scored three at the Estadio Ciudad de La Plata in a win over Independiente.

Despite winning back-to-back at home in the Primera División, Estudiantes didn't win in two away games after allowing Godoy Cruz to gain their first victory of the season on 25 August. Estudiantes lost for the third time in four fixtures on 30 August, as Lucas Robertone's goal condemned them to defeat versus Vélez Sarsfield.

September
Juan Cascini terminated his contract with Estudiantes on 2 September.

Squad

Transfers
Domestic transfer windows:3 July 2019 to 24 September 201920 January 2020 to 19 February 2020.

Transfers in

Transfers out

Loans in

Loans out

Friendlies

Pre-season
On 22 June 2019, Estudiantes confirmed pre-season friendlies with Estudiantes Reserves (29 June), Estrella de Berisso (10 July) and San Lorenzo (13 July); with a fourth opponent (6 July) to be revealed; later announced as Uruguay's Fénix. All fixtures were originally scheduled at the Country Club in City Bell, though the San Lorenzo and Fénix encounters were moved to the Estadio Pedro Bidegain in Buenos Aires and the Estadio Ciudad de La Plata in La Plata. The friendly with Estrella de Berisso was cancelled on 2 July, with an encounter against Cambaceres being set in its place. A match in City Bell with Temperley was also scheduled for 13 July, though was later cancelled due to bad weather.

Mid-season
After facing their academy on 6 August, Estudiantes would then play Cambaceres in a friendly, as they did in July, on 10 August.

Competitions

Primera División

League table

Relegation table

Source: AFA

Results summary

Matches
The fixtures for the 2019–20 campaign were released on 10 July.

Copa Argentina

The Estadio Coloso del Ruca Quimey in Cutral Có would serve as the setting for Estudiantes' round of thirty-two tie in the Copa Argentina against Mitre - at Alianza's home venue, therefore neutral for both sides on 20 July - as is customary.

Copa de la Superliga

Squad statistics

Appearances and goals

Statistics accurate as of 31 August 2019.

Goalscorers

Notes

References

Estudiantes de La Plata seasons
Estudiantes